Thomas Leavitt may refer to:

 Thomas Leavitt (banker) (1795–1850), president of the Bank of New Brunswick, diplomat, politician and businessman
 Thomas Leavitt (inventor) (1827–1899), American inventor
 Thomas Leavitt (settler) (1616–1696), English Puritan and settler of the Province of New Hampshire
 Thomas Rowell Leavitt (1834–1891), Mormon settler of Leavitt, Alberta, Canada